Altınkaya is a village in the Tercan District, Erzincan Province, Turkey. The village had a population of 27 in 2021.

The hamlets of Karaali, Karhane and Musaağa are attached to the village.

References 

Villages in Tercan District
Kurdish settlements in Erzincan Province